Franz Hellens, born Frédéric van Ermengem (8 September 1881, in Brussels – 20 January 1972, in Brussels) was a prolific Belgian novelist, poet and critic. Although of Flemish descent, he wrote entirely in French, and lived in Paris from 1947 to 1971. He was nominated for the Nobel Prize in Literature four times.

He is known as one of the major figures in Belgian magic realism (fantastique quotidien), and as the indefatigable editor of Signaux de France et de Belgique (later Le Disque vert). The only work translated into English is Mémoires d'Elseneur ("Memoirs from Elsinore", 1954).

His father, Émile van Ermengem, was the bacteriologist who discovered the cause of botulism. His younger brother was the writer François Maret (Frans van Ermengem).

Life
His father was a bacteriologist, and when in 1886 he was appointed professor at the University of Ghent the Van Ermengem family moved from Brussels to Wetteren, and then to Ghent in 1894. After an abortive attempt to publish a collection of sonnets, Frédéric began studying law at the same university in 1900, but after earning his degree he gave up the idea of a legal career in order to continue writing, moving to Ixelles and taking employment as a librarian in 1906. His first book was the novel En ville morte. In 1907 he married Marguerite Nyst against the will of his parents; they had one daughter, Claire (born 1909). He published two collections of short stories, Hors-le-vent (1909) and Clartés latentes (1912).

At the outbreak of war, Hellens was ineligible for service. He spent some months in England before travelling to the Côte d'Azur, where he met many famous artists and writers, and fell in love with a married Russian named Maria Marcovna Miloslawski (1893–1947). He returned with her to Brussels in 1920, the same year he published Mélusine, and married her on 20 July 1925, having divorced Marguerite in 1919. They had one daughter, Marie-Elisabeth (b. 1927), and two sons, Alexandre (1921–1940) and Serge (b. 1929).

On 1 May 1921 Hellens and André Salmon founded the Signaux de France et de Belgique (1921–1941), a magazine which had great influence on Belgian literary life. He made trips to Italy in 1925 and 1926 and to Norway in 1936. His father died in 1932, an event which prompted him to begin writing his voluminous diaries. In 1937 he signed the famous Manifeste du lundi of Charles Plisnier, a denunciation of regionalism.

His eldest son died in fighting near Rouen; nevertheless he continued to publish work throughout the war. Maria died on 5 October 1947. He married Hélène Burbulis on 26 November and moved to Paris, where he stayed until her death in 1971. He reestablished Le Disque vert with René de Soher in 1951, and compiled a collected volume of his poetry in 1959. Professing himself dissatisfied with all his work, he continued to write throughout his old age.

In an interview from August 1970, Vladimir Nabokov said:
Hellens was a tall, lean, quiet, very dignified man of whom I saw a good deal in Belgium in the middle thirties when I was reading my own stuff in lecture halls for large émigré audiences. La femme partagée (1929), a novel, I like particularly, and there are three or four other books that stand out among the many that Hellens wrote. I tried to get someone in the States to publish him -- Laughlin, perhaps -- but nothing came of it. Hellens would get excellent reviews, was beloved in Belgium, and what friends he had in Paris tried to brighten and broaden his reputation. It is a shame that he is read less than that awful Monsieur Camus and even more awful Monsieur Sartre.

Selected works 

 En ville morte, 1906
 Les hors-le-vent, 1909
 Les clartés latentes. Vingt contes et paraboles, 1912
 Nocturnal, preceded by Quinze histoires, 1919
 Mélusine, 1920, 1952
 La femme au prisme, 1920
 Bass-Bassina-Boulou, 1922
 Réalités fantastiques, 1923
 Notes prises d'une lucarne, 1925
 Oeil-de-Dieu, 1925, 1959
 Le naïf, Paris, 1926
 Eclairages, 1916–1923, 1926
 L'Enfant et l'écuyère, 1927
 Le jeune homme Annibal, 1929, 1961
 La femme partagée, 1929
 Les filles du désir, 1930
 Documents secrets, 1905–1931, 1932
 Poésie de la veille et du lendemain 1917–1927, 1932
 Fraîcheur de la mer, 1933
 Frédéric, 1935
 Le magasin aux poudres, 1936
 Nouvelles réalités fantastiques, 1943
 Moralités peu salutaires, 1943
 Fantômes vivants, 1944
 La vie seconde, 1945, 1963
 Moreldieu, 1946, 1960
 Naître et mourir, 1948
 Miroirs conjugués, 1950
 Pourriture noble, 1951
 Testament, 1951
 L'homme de soixante ans, 1951
 Les marées de l'Escaut, 1953
 Mémoires d'Elseneur, 1954. English translation by Howard Curtis. (2000). Memories of Elsinore. New York: Peter Lang
 Style et caractère, 1956
 Les saisons de Pontoise, 1956
 Dans l'automne de mon grand âge, 1956
 Documents secrets 1905-1956, 1958
 Poésie complète, 1905–1959, 1959
 Petit théâtre aux chandelles, 1960
 L'âge dur, 1957–1960, 1961
 Valeurs sûres, 1962
 Herbes méchantes, 1964
 La comédie des portraits, 1965
 Poétique des éléments et des mythes, 1966
 Le dernier jour du monde, 1967
 Le fantastique réel, 1967
 Arrière-saisons, 1960–1967, 1967
 Paroles sans musique, 1969
 Cet âge qu'on dit grand, essay, 1970

Awards
 Prix triennal pour les nouvelles (for Fraîcheur de la mer, 1933)
 Grand Prix de la Société des Gens de Lettres (1956)
 Grand Prix de Littérature française hors de France (Fondation Nessim Habif, 1964)

Notes

Bibliography
 R. Frickx. Franz Hellens ou Le temps dépassé. Palais des Académies, Bruxelles, 1992.

External links
Succinct biography and bibliography 
Biography, bibliography, sources de references 
Chronology 

1881 births
1972 deaths
20th-century Belgian novelists
Belgian male novelists
20th-century Belgian poets
Belgian male poets
20th-century Belgian male writers
Ghent University alumni
Writers from Brussels